This is a list of personal titles arranged in a sortable table. They can be sorted:
 Alphabetically
 By language, nation, or tradition of origin
 By function. See Separation of duties for a description of the Executive, Judicial, and Legislative functions as they are generally understood today. Titles that bestow functional authority with minimal executive, judicial, or legislative power are listed as Administrative. Titles that bestow political or spiritual authority with minimal executive, judicial, or legislative power are listed as Ceremonial.
 By manner in which the title is usually achieved. Most title-holders are Appointed to their rank by someone higher in the system or Elected by people equal in the system. Historically, many titles were achieved through Hereditary birthright. A few historical titles have been randomly Chosen By Lot or Purchased outright. For those unofficial titles granted as a sign of respect, such as Mister or Prophet, the word Identified is used here.
 By scope of authority. Especially with historical titles, this scope may have changed over time, but the most usual understanding of the title today is implied. Personal titles are not part of a governing body, and have authority only over those who individually choose to follow the title-holder. Tribal titles give the title-holder authority over a bloodline rather than a physical geography. Institutional titles are mostly confined to a specific campus, corporation, temple, or other private or semi-public institution. Divisional is applied to most military & police ranks, with the number of people under that rank's command listed when known. Local titles are those with authority in a metropolitan or similar area, such as a mayor. Provincial titles are those with authority over a constituent state, such as a United States governor. Regional titles are those with authority over multiple constituent states, such as a federal judge. Courtly titles have no sovereign power of their own but are granted high prestige by, and are possibly able to exert influence over, a head of state. Similarly, Diplomatic titles bear no sovereignty of their own, but are vested with the equivalent of sovereignty by a head of state. National titles are at the level of a head of government or head of state, with authority over a sovereign nation. Supranational titles are those with authority over multiple sovereign nations. Supernatural titles are those applied solely to deceased figures, such as saints, or to superhuman beings, such as angels and gods.

For in-depth information please follow the links to individual titles.

See also
Imperial, royal and noble ranks
List of comparative military ranks
List of academic ranks

Titles